Anosiala is a rural municipality in Madagascar. It belongs to the district of Ambohidratrimo, which is a part of Analamanga Region. 
The population of the commune was 36,863 in 2019.

Ethnics
The town is inhabited by the Merina.

References

mg:Anosiala (Ambohidratrimo)
Populated places in Analamanga